Andra Veidemann (née Andra Eesmaa; born 18 July 1955 Tallinn) is an Estonian historian-ethnologist, editor, diplomat, and politician. She was a member of VII Riigikogu. From 1999 until 2001, she was the editor-in-chief of AS Kirjastus Ilo publishing house. From 2006 until 2008, she was the Cultural Attaché at the Embassy of the Republic of Estonia in Moscow and Russia.

References

Living people
1955 births
20th-century Estonian historians
Estonian ethnologists
Estonian editors
Estonian women editors
Estonian women diplomats
Members of the Riigikogu, 1992–1995
Members of the Riigikogu, 1995–1999
Women members of the Riigikogu
Social Democratic Party (Estonia) politicians
Estonian Centre Party politicians
Recipients of the Order of the White Star, 4th Class
Politicians from Tallinn
Writers from Tallinn
21st-century Estonian historians
Estonian women historians